Likit Gammatep is a 2007 Thai drama/comedy/romance TV series. It stars Ann Thongprasom and Krissada Pornweroj in Channel 3.

Cast
Ann Thongprasom as Karnploo "Karn"
Krissada Pornweroj (Smart) as Pinitnai "Nit"
Apinun Prasertwattanakul (M) as Prada = Karnploo's ex-boyfriend who cheated on her.
Sakaojai Poolsawad (Aom) as Praelee = Nit's ex-girlfriend who later becomes Prada's wife, but still tries to get Nit back to her.
Supporting Cast
Karnjana Jindawat as Jinda = Caretaker in Pinitnai's father household.
Duangta Toongkamanee as Karnploo's Aunt = Karnploo's evil aunt and the one who sold Karnploo to Pinitnai's father for 10 million baht and a box of jewelries.
Andrew Cronin as Piboon "Boon"  = Karnploo's aunt's son and Karnploo's step brother. 
Chotiros Kaewpinit (Sobee) as Passorn = Karnploo's friend and Piboon's love interest.
Suthee Siangwaan (Am) as Pusit = Pinitnai's friend and a playboy, he usually seen around many girls but has been seriously in love with Karnploo's step sister.
Montri Janeaksorn (Pu) as Pinitnai's Father = A playboy despite his age, he is usually seen with many girls, but is truly love only 2 woman Pinitnai's late mother and Karnploo. He later died in the story after having a heart attack while he was making out with one of his woman.
Tatsanawalai Ongajitthichai as Phantipa
Pattra Apirathkul 
Hana Tudsanawalai 
Daraneenuch Pohpiti (Top) as Pinitnai's aunt
Orasa Prompatan 
Suchao Pongwilai as Praelee's father

References

Channel 3 (Thailand) original programming
Thai television soap operas
2007 Thai television series debuts
2000s Thai television series